A party is a group of characters adventuring together in a role-playing game. In tabletop role-playing, a party is composed of a group of player characters, occasionally with the addition of non-player character allies controlled by those players or by the gamemaster. In computer games, the relationship between the party and the players varies considerably. Online role-playing games or MMORPG parties are often, in the above sense, of the same constituency as tabletop parties, except that the non-player allies are always controlled to a lesser or greater extent by the computer AI. In single-player computer games, the player generally controls all party members to a varying degree. 

Examples of games which have parties include the tabletop RPG Vampire: the Requiem, the single-player role-playing Baldur's Gate series, MMORPGs such as World of Warcraft, Anarchy Online and Warhammer Online, the open-world action-RPG Genshin Impact, and the multi-player computer action-RPG Final Fantasy XI.

Party role in gameplay

Resource management 
Resource management is a crucial part of role-playing games, and any player-controlled character, whether they can participate in combat or not, are always useful if they have the ability to carry heavy or bulky items. Non-player characters or alternative player-controlled characters used by the player with only this purpose in mind are called mules. Usually, however, and exclusively in tabletop and single-player games, party members are a valued for their tactical and/or story potential.

Individual Party Roles 
In both single and multiplayer games a party typically consists of a group of characters who often fit into familiar roles or archetypes. For most MMORPGs these are that of the Warrior, Thief and Mage, sometimes referred to as a "Holy Trinity". These games often have game systems designed around these archetypes, requiring a set tank to protect others (warrior), set players for dealing damage to help eliminate threats (thief/mage) and set players for the purpose of magically healing or eliminating negative effects (mage).  Players in single-player games are free to create well rounded parties where the diversity of tools or from each character can become the groups' strength. Some RPGs, like Divinity: Original Sin II have gone as far as to let players choose or change their companions archetypes away from that which is initially programmed for them, allowing even more control over what type of party manifests throughout the game.

Non-player character allies 
Since the advent of three-dimensional and isometric computer environments in games, the use of parties and computer AI control of non-player party members has increased. Exceptions to the latter include Final Fantasy XII (itself an exception to the rest of the series in that combat and travel takes place in the same 3D environment), in which the default actions of all members of the party follows behaviour scripts bought with game money and customized by the player, unless the player took control of party members and specified their actions.

References 

Role-playing game terminology